Kasaze is a village on the right bank of the Savinja River in the Municipality of Žalec in east-central Slovenia. The area is part of the traditional region of Styria. The municipality is now included in the Savinja Statistical Region.

References

External links
Kasaze at Geopedia

Populated places in the Municipality of Žalec